Alaminos, officially the City of Alaminos, is a 4th class component city in the province of Pangasinan, Philippines, and is known for being the home of the Hundred Islands National Park, which is composed of 124 islands and is located off the coast of Barangay Lucap. According to the 2020 census, it has a population of 99,397 people. The city is named after Juan Alaminos y de Vivar, a former governor-general of the Philippines.

In 2009, it was announced that Alaminos Airport would be built near the city as a commercial airport for Pangasinan province. However, the timeline for construction of the airport has repeatedly slipped; as of 2015, the project is in limbo.

History 
Alaminos was formerly part of Bolinao, known as Barrio Casborran, formerly the part of Zambales. In 1747, it became an independent town.

The Communist Party of the Philippines was founded by Jose Maria Sison in the remote barangay of Dulacac on December 26, 1968.

Alaminos was badly hit in May 2009 by Typhoon Emong which damaged many houses in the city, including the roof of the main church. Due to this, several organizations had requested donations and aid to help in restoring the town back to its former self.

Cityhood 

By virtue of Republic Act 9025, signed by President Gloria Macapagal Arroyo on March 5, 2001, Alaminos was converted into a city after 85% of the voters favored the ratification in a plebiscite held on March 28, 2001.

Geography 

Barangays 
Alaminos City is politically subdivided into 39 barangays. These barangays are headed by elected officials: Barangay Captain, Barangay Council, whose members are called Barangay Councilors. All are elected every three years.

Climate

Demographics

Economy

Government
Alaminos, belonging to the first congressional district of the province of Pangasinan, is governed by a mayor designated as its local chief executive and by a municipal council as its legislative body in accordance with the Local Government Code. The mayor, vice mayor, and the councilors are elected directly by the people through an election which is being held every three years.

Elected officials

Media
AM Stations:
DZIN 801 (Vanguard Radio Network)
DZWM Radyo Totoo 864 (Catholic Media Network)

FM Stations:
99.3 Spirit FM (Catholic Media Network)
100.1 Radyo Natin (Manila Broadcasting Company)
102.7 Big Sound FM (Vanguard Radio Network)

Cable & Satellite TV Providers
Pangasinan Educational Cable TV (PECTV)
USATV
Cignal TV
G Sat

Festivals

The Galila Hundred Islands Festival is held from March 16 to 21 every year. Galila means “come” in the vernacular, and the festival includes the 100 Islands Adventure Race.

Sister cities 
 Marikina, Metro Manila

Images

References

External links 

 
 City Profile at the National Competitiveness Council of the Philippines
 Alaminos at the Pangasinan Government Website
 Local Governance Performance Management System
 [ Philippine Standard Geographic Code]
 Philippine Census Information

Cities in Pangasinan
Populated places established in 1744
1744 establishments in the Philippines
Component cities in the Philippines